Orthotylus adenocarpi adenocarpi is a subspecies of bug from the Miridae family that can be found in Benelux, Czech Republic, Denmark, France, Germany, Great Britain, Ireland, Poland, Spain, and Sweden.

References

Insects described in 1857
Hemiptera of Europe
adenocarpi adenocarpi